The Monastery of Saint Pishoy  (also spelled Bishoy, Pshoi, or Bishoi) in Wadi El Natrun, Beheira Governorate, Egypt, is the most famous monastery of the Coptic Orthodox Church of Alexandria named after Pishoy. It is the easternmost of the four current monasteries of Wadi el Natrun.

Foundation and ancient history
Pishoy founded this monastery in the fourth century. On December 13, 841 (4 Koiak, 557 AM), Pope Joseph I of Alexandria fulfilled Pishoy's wishes and moved his body as well as that of Paul of Tammah to this monastery, both of which were originally interred at the Monastery of Pishoy in Deir el-Bersha. Today, the two bodies lie in the main church of the monastery.

Modern history
Today, the Monastery of Saint Pishoy contains the relics of Pishoy, Paul of Tammah, and relics of other saints. Eyewitnesses recount that the body of Pishoy remains incorrupt. Pope Shenouda III of Alexandria is also interred there.

The monastery has five churches, the main one being named after Pishoy. The other churches are named after Mary, Abaskhiron the Soldier, Saint George, and the archangel Michael. The monastery is surrounded by a keep, which was built in the fifth century to protect the monastery against the attacks by Berbers. An initial castle was built early in the twentieth century, but was later replaced by a four-storied castle built by Pope Shenouda III. In addition, the monastery contains a well known as the Well of the Martyrs. Coptic tradition says the Berbers washed their swords in this well after having killed the Forty-Nine Martyrs of Scetis and subsequently threw their bodies in the well before Christians retrieved the bodies and buried them in the nearby Monastery of Saint Macarius the Great.

Under Shenouda III, Pope of the Coptic Orthodox Church of Alexandria from 1971 to 2012, new land around the monastery was purchased and developed. Poultry, cattle breeding and dairy facilities were developed. Ancient buildings and churches were restored, and cells for monks, retreat houses, a papal residence, annexes for a reception area, an auditorium, conference rooms, fences and gates were built. Shenouda III was buried here after his death in March 2012. Bishop Sarabamon the former abbot of the monastery is also buried here.

Popes from the Monastery of St. Pishoy
Pope Gabriel VIII (1525–1570)
Pope Macarius III (1942–1945)
 Pope Tawadros II (2012–present)

Abbot
Aghapius, Bishop and Abbot of the Monastery of Saint Pishoy.

Other monasteries named after Saint Pishoy
 The Monastery of Saint Pishoy at Deir El Barsha, near Mallawi
 The Monastery of Saint Pishoy at Armant, east of Armant

Other monasteries of Wadi el Natrun ("Scete")
 Monastery of Saint Macarius the Great
 Syrian Monastery, Egypt
 Paromeos Monastery

Gallery

See also
Desert Fathers

References

External links
 Official Website of the Monastery of Saint Pishoy (in Arabic)

Christian monasteries in Egypt
Coptic Orthodox monasteries in Egypt
Oriental Orthodox congregations established in the 4th century
Christian monasteries established in the 4th century
Buildings and structures in Beheira Governorate